Interactive Digital Photomontage is GPL-licensed software for creating interactive digital photomontages. It was jointly developed by University of Washington and Microsoft Research and based on a publication in ACM Transactions on Graphics in 2004.

Overview
The software can extend depth-of-field, remove objects, stitch panoramas, and relight objects, among other features. It is a cross-platform program developed with wxWidgets toolkit and uses publicly available but non-GPL graph cut software developed by Vladimir Kolmogorov at Microsoft.

References

External links

Funny Pictures Website
Free Images & Wallpapers

Free photo software
Free graphics software
Software that uses wxWidgets